Cheikh Sy (born 5 June 1990) is a Senegalese football player.

Career
Sy played in UAE, as well as in Syria, Senegal and Lebanon. He is plays as an attacking midfielder.

Honours 
Individual
 Lebanese Premier League Team of the Season: 2013–14, 2014–15

References 

Living people
1990 births
Senegalese footballers
Expatriate footballers in Syria
Expatriate footballers in Lebanon
Expatriate footballers in Jordan
Association football midfielders
Lebanese Premier League players
Nejmeh SC players
Al Ansar FC players
AS Pikine players
Syrian Premier League players
Senegalese expatriate footballers
Senegalese expatriate sportspeople in Lebanon